Jeana Lee Yeager (born May 18, 1952) is an American aviator.  She co-piloted, along with Dick Rutan, the first non-stop, non-refueled flight around the world in the Rutan Voyager aircraft from  December 14 to 23, 1986. The flight took 9 days, 3 minutes, and 44 seconds and covered 24,986 miles (40,211 km), almost doubling the old distance record set by a Boeing B-52 strategic bomber in 1962.

Early life and career
Jeana Lee Yeager was born on May 18, 1952, in Fort Worth, Texas, to Royal Leland "Lee" Yeager (March 12, 1918 - March 17, 2001) and Alice Evaree Snider ( Harris; October 21, 1924 – February 5, 2013). As a child, she and her family variously lived in Garland, Texas, Oxnard, California, and Commerce, Texas. Following graduation from high school, Yeager, at age 19, married a police officer; they divorced five years later. She then worked as a draftsman and surveyor for a geothermal energy company in Santa Rosa, California. In 1978, Yeager obtained her private pilot's license while still living in Santa Rosa.

Yeager worked for Robert Truax while he was developing a reusable spacecraft. She met Dick Rutan in 1980 and they soon both set distance records in the Rutan VariEze and Long-EZ planes, designed by Dick's brother Burt Rutan. In early 1982, Yeager set a new women's speed record for the 2,000-kilometer closed course and in the fall of 1984 using the VariEze, she set the open-distance record of 2,427.1 statute miles.

Jeana Yeager is not related to fellow aviator and test pilot General Chuck Yeager.

Round-the-world flight

Yeager and Dick Rutan decided to attempt to fly around the world without refueling. They formed Voyager Aircraft, Inc., and Burt Rutan began designing the aircraft. Initially unable to find a commercial sponsor, Yeager started the Voyager Impressive People (VIP) program which became the major source of money to build, test, and fly the aircraft. By mid-1986, Voyager was ready for the flight. Yeager flew as co-pilot on the 216-hour flight and set a world absolute distance record. This was the first time a woman had been listed in an absolute category.

Dick Rutan and Voyager sued Yeager in 1995, alleging that she had misappropriated memorabilia and funds from Voyager. The lawsuit was dropped in 1996.

Awards
In recognition of the 1986 Voyager flight, Yeager received both the Harmon and National Air and Space Museum trophies, the FAI De la Vaulx Medal, the Presidential Citizens Medal from President Ronald Reagan and the Collier Trophy (becoming its first female recipient). She shared the Presidential Citizens Medal and Collier Trophy with Dick and Burt Rutan.  She was also awarded the Edward Longstreth Medal from the Franklin Institute in 1988. In 2013, Flying magazine ranked Yeager (with Dick Rutan) No. 33 on their list of the 51 Heroes of Aviation.

References

Further reading

External links

Jeana Yeager Collection at Texas A&M University–Commerce
Round the world flight at National Air and Space Museum

1952 births
Living people
Aviators from Texas
Harmon Trophy winners
Collier Trophy recipients
Flight distance record holders
People from Fort Worth, Texas
Presidential Citizens Medal recipients
American aviation record holders
American women aviation record holders
21st-century American women